The 1987 Cincinnati Open (Also known as the Thriftway ATP Championships and Pringles Light Classic for sponsorship reasons) was a men's tennis tournament played on outdoor hard courts at the Lindner Family Tennis Center in Mason, Ohio, United States that was part of the 1987 Nabisco Grand Prix and the men's draw was held from August 17 through August 23, 1987. Second-seeded Stefan Edberg won the singles title.

Finals

Singles
 Stefan Edberg defeated  Boris Becker, 6–4, 6–1 
 It was Edberg's 5th singles title of the year and the 13th of his career.

Doubles
 Ken Flach /  Robert Seguso defeated  John Fitzgerald /  Steve Denton, 7–5, 6–3

References

External links
 
 ITF tournament edition details
 ATP tournament profile

Cincinnati Open
Cincinnati Open
Cincinnati Open
Cincinnati Masters
Cincin